Astwood Bank is a district within Redditch. Astwood Bank is near the Warwickshire - Worcestershire border, near villages such as Studley, Sambourne, Callow Hill, Feckenham, and Cookhill.

Astwood Bank is noted for its successful cricket team, who have twice played at Lord's in the National Village Knock Out Final. The A441 Evesham Road is the main trunk road through Astwood Bank from Redditch. Astwood Bank has an annual carnival. The carnival has been a big part of the village for over 30 years.

History

Church 
Residents held church services in the local school until a church was built in 1883–84. The foundation stone was laid by Lady Georgina Vernon of Hanbury Hall. The church of St. Matthias & St. George was originally designed by W. J. Hopkins as a large church with a south tower, only the east end was completed by him in 1884. The nave was added by W. Cogswell in 1911 and consecrated by Bishop Louis Mylne. The tower was never built hence the deep sloping roof.  

The church was built as a chapelry of Feckenham. It became an independent parish in 1950.

Railway station
A railway station called Studley & Astwood Bank railway station served the village, with service going as far north as Lichfield Trent Valley and as far south as Tewkesbury. The line was closed in 1964 so now Redditch railway station is the end of the line. The station building still exists as a domestic dwelling house and is located on the Slough, just into Green Lane, Studley, Warwickshire. It is about two miles from Astwood Bank and one mile from Studley.

Politics

Politically, Astwood Bank is part of the Astwood Bank and Feckenham ward. The councillors are:
 Craig Warhurst  (Conservative)-(Astwood Bank & Feckenham)
 Brandon Clayton (Conservative)-(Astwood Bank & Feckenham)
Craig Randall (UKIP)-(Astwood Bank & Feckenham)
Josh Carter (Liberal Democrats)-(Astwood Bank)
Aaron Bwail (Green Party)-(Astwood Bank)

Education
The village is served by Astwood Bank Primary School and Ridgeway Secondary School.

Notable residents
 Lionel Britton (1887–1971) was a working class writer from Astwood Bank.
 Dan Sealey of Ocean Colour Scene and Merrymouth was born in Astwood Bank.
 Adam Barry of Merrymouth and co founder of Americana band The Misers has lived in Astwood Bank since leaving school in 1996.
 Charlie Clemmow, actress.

References

External links
 

Villages in Worcestershire